The Hitchhiker's Guide to the Galaxy is a science fiction comedy series created by Douglas Adams.

The Hitchhiker's Guide to the Galaxy may also refer to:

 The Hitchhiker's Guide to the Galaxy (radio series), a 1978 radio series
 The Hitchhiker's Guide to the Galaxy (novel), a 1979 novel
 The Hitchhiker's Guide to the Galaxy (TV series), a 1981 BBC TV series 
 The Hitchhiker's Guide to the Galaxy (video game), a 1984 text-based computer game by Infocom
 The Hitchhiker's Guide to the Galaxy (film), a 2005 film by Garth Jennings
 The Hitchhiker's Guide to the Galaxy (fictional), the book as it appears in the franchise

See also
 H2g2, a British-based collaborative online encyclopedia project founded by Douglas Adams in 1999